Jan Grudziński (3 December 1907– May/June 1940) was a submarine commander of the Polish Navy during World War II.

Biography 
Jan Grudziński was born in Kiev son of Stanisław and Regina Radecka. After Poland regained independence, in late 1918 he settled with his parents in Lwów where in 1921 he entered the First Cadet Corps. After his graduating he entered the Polish Naval Academy and became sub-lieutenant (podporucznik) in 1928. In 1932 he served as executive officer on the torpedo boat ORP Kujawiak. He completed the underwater weapons training (1933–1934) then in 1937, the submarine navigation course. In 1938 he was executive officer on the submarine ORP Sęp. Shortly before the start of World War II, he was transferred to the submarine ORP Orzeł.

During the Invasion of Poland, when ORP Orzeł was patrolling the Baltic Sea, Grudziński took command of the ship due to illness of the commanding officer Henryk Kłoczkowski. On 14 September 1939 Orzeł arrived to Tallinn where Kłoczkowski was taken to hospital. The next day, at the insistence of the Germans, Estonian military authorities boarded the ship, interned the crew, confiscated all the navigation aids and maps, and commenced dismantling all the armaments. On 17 September Orzeł escaped and Grudziński decided to continue to patrol the Baltic Sea. After exhausting the possibilities of combat, Grudziński took the decision to join United Kingdom where he arrived on 14 October.

On 21 October Grudziński was officially named commander of ORP Orzeł. The submarine after the necessary repairs in late 1939 undertook cruises in the North Sea. During these patrols, she succeeded in sinking the German troopship  and probably a patrol boat.

Orzeł departed on her seventh patrol on 23 May, to the central North Sea. No radio signals had been received from her since she had sailed, it disappeared without a trace. Orzeł probably hit a mine. 8 June 1940 was officially accepted as the day of her loss. Jan Grudziński perished with his crew.

Awards and decorations
 Virtuti Militari, Silver Cross
 Virtuti Militari, Golden Cross
 Cross of Valour
 Navy Medal (Medal Morski)
 Distinguished Service Order

Military promotions

References
 
 
 

1907 births
1940 deaths
Recipients of the Distinguished Service Cross (United Kingdom)
Polish military personnel killed in World War II
Recipients of the Cross of Valour (Poland)
Recipients of the Silver Cross of the Virtuti Militari
Recipients of the Gold Cross of the Virtuti Militari
Companions of the Distinguished Service Order
Polish submarine commanders
Polish Navy officers